Dooney is a surname. Notable people with the surname include:

 Kevin Dooney (born 1993), Irish runner
 Michael Dooney, American comic book writer and artist and toy designer
 Roy Dooney (born 1958), Irish runner and father of Kevin
 Tom Dooney (born 1939), New Zealand sprint canoeist

See also
 Dooney & Bourke, an American fashion accessory company
 The Fiddler of Dooney, an 1899 poem by William Butler Yeats